Bottoming may refer to:

Bottoming (bending), a bending process for sheet metal and other thin materials
Top, bottom and versatile, a sexual role
Bottoming cycle, the low-temperature power-generation cycle of a combined cycle power plant

See also
Bottom (disambiguation)